Bohdan Mytsyk (born 8 March 1998) is a Ukrainian football defender. He plays for Kazakhstani club Maktaaral.

Career
Mytsyk is a product of the Vorskla Poltava and Metalurh Donetsk youth sportive team systems.

After dissolution of Metalurh Donetsk in 2015, he was signed by FC Stal Kamianske and made his debut for main-squad FC Stal in the winning game against FC Zorya Luhansk on 16 July 2017 in the Ukrainian Premier League.

References

External links
Profile at FFU Official Site (Ukr)

1998 births
Living people
Sportspeople from Poltava
Ukrainian footballers
Ukrainian expatriate footballers
Ukrainian Premier League players
Ukrainian expatriate sportspeople in Lithuania
Expatriate footballers in Lithuania
Ukrainian expatriate sportspeople in Moldova
Expatriate footballers in Moldova
FC Stal Kamianske players
FK Atlantas players
FC Inhulets Petrove players
FC Codru Lozova players
FC Prykarpattia Ivano-Frankivsk (1998) players
Moldovan Super Liga players
Association football defenders
A Lyga players
Ida-Virumaa FC Alliance players